Torquigener hypselogeneion, commonly known as the orange-spotted toadfish, is a fish of the pufferfish family Tetraodontidae native to the Indian Ocean and northwestern Australia.

References

External links
 Fishes of Australia : Torquigener hypselogeneion

hypselogeneion
Marine fish of Northern Australia
orange-spotted toadfish